The following is a list of international bilateral treaties between Australia and France
 Early treaties were extended to Australia by the British Empire, however they are still generally in force.
 European Union treaties, extended to France are not included below.

References

Treaties of Australia
Bilateral treaties of France
Treaties